Mommy Says No! (stylized as MOMMY Says NO!) is an album by the Asylum Street Spankers, released on February 6, 2007. It is the group's first album meant for children.

Track listing
"Be Like You" (3:36)
"Training Wheel Rag" (2:28)
"You Only Love Me for My Lunchbox" (5:06)
"Everybody Loves My Baby" (2:51)
"Sidekick" (4:30)
"When I Grow Up" (5:20)
"Mommy Says No!" (2:15)
"Don't Turn Out the Light" (4:47)
"Boogers" (4:11)
"Sliver" (1:58)
"Super Frog" (4:08)
"Think About Your Troubles" (3:04)
"When I Grow Up (Part 2)" (1:50)

2007 albums
Children's music albums
Asylum Street Spankers albums
Yellow Dog Records albums